Diyan Valkov (born 13 September 1993) is a Bulgarian footballer who plays as a goalkeeper for Sayana Haskovo.

Career
In August 2016, Valkov joined Litex.  He left the club in June 2018.

On 28 June 2018, Valkov signed with CSKA 1948.

References

External links
 
 

1993 births
Living people
Sportspeople from Pleven
Bulgarian footballers
First Professional Football League (Bulgaria) players
Second Professional Football League (Bulgaria) players
PFC Slavia Sofia players
FC Lyubimets players
FC Pirin Razlog players
FC Vereya players
PFC Litex Lovech players
FC CSKA 1948 Sofia players
FC Botev Galabovo players
FC Lokomotiv Gorna Oryahovitsa players
FC Vitosha Bistritsa players
Association football goalkeepers